Case Closed: Captured in Her Eyes, known as  in Japan, is a Japanese anime feature film based on the Case Closed series. It was released on December 29, 2009 in the United States. This film achieved a box office income of 2.5 billion Japanese yen.

Plot

Ran has a flashback of Shinichi taking her to the fountain at Tropical Land, the local amusement park. Conan (using Shinichi’s voice) calls Ran in a phone booth and she asks if they could go back to Tropical Land. The Detective Boys passes by causing Conan to quickly hang up.

The kids have come up with a new riddle but Conan solves it easily. Genta tries to cross a busy street, but policeman Osamu Narasawa stops him and advises the kids to wait for the next green light. When they finish crossing, Conan turns to see a mysterious man with an umbrella shoot Osamu. The man runs, and Conan attempts to give chase but is unable to. When Conan asks Osamu if he knew who shot him, the man grabs for his notebook and succumbs to his injuries.

The Detective Boys is taken to a police conference because they were witnesses to the crime. However, the conference goes nowhere as Ayumi, Mitshuiko, and Genta disagree on how the culprit looked. Conan states that the culprit's raincoat and umbrella were both a shade of gray, remembering that the umbrella was in their right hand, proving that the culprit was left-handed, as the gun was shot with the left.

Later, a woman in a garage finds Detective Shiba shot to death, who was holding his police notebook in his right hand. The following morning, Kogoro asks Megure for more details, but Megure hangs up, saying that he is busy. Megure is shown talking to Santos, saying that the information only the two of them know must remain a secret.

Shiratori’s sister later has a party to bless her marriage. When Kogoro sees Megure again, he tries to get info, but the Megure remains silent. Conan realizes that Meguire may know something that is kept confidential. Kogoro and Conan later try to blackmail Takagi using the info that Takagi likes Sato. Takagi tells Kogoro and Conan that the second victim held his notebook during his dying moments, something not mentioned to the media. Shiratori appears and tells Kogoro that all the info he will be getting, and that he "need not to know." Conan thinks of the words and fears the killer may be associated to the police force, or the entire force itself.

Sonoko and Ran are shown asking Eri how Kogoro proposed to her, while Sato goes to the bathroom. Ran runs into her as she leaves. The culprit then sets off a bomb, cutting off power to the floor. Ran picks up a flashlight from under the sink, which the killer uses to shoot. Sato, however, shields Ran and is shot multiple times. Light from the flashlight shines on the culprit's face (the traditional humanoid silhouette). Sato is shown unconscious, and Ran faints when she sees her bloody hands, blaming herself for what has happened. At the hospital, Megure states Sato has a 50-50 chance of living. Surgeon-turned-psychiatrist Kyosuke Kazato diagnoses Ran with amnesia, explaining that she lost memories of everybody she knew, including the memories of the current day.

Megure decides to reveal the info about the case to Kogoro. A gifted surgeon named Thomas Jinno got drunk and committed suicide by slitting his neck. Inspector Tomonari  led the investigation with his subordinates Osamu, Shiba, and Sato. During the case, Tomonari suffered a heart attack, insists that no one worry, and to continue the stakeout. Sato is forced to send Tomonari to the hospital, where he dies from his condition. The remaining two see the targets, noticing that one of them is Chief Toshiro Odarigi's son, Toshiya. The case was, however, abruptly concluded as suicide. Megure concludes his description of the case by informing that Simone and the others have recently been investigating the case on their free time.

Someone has been stalking Ran in the hospital's courtyard and inside her hospital room, leading Conan to inform Kogoro that she may have seen the culprit, which makes her a possible target.

The next day, the Detective Boys stays with Ran, acting as bodyguards. Ai remarks that it may be better if Ran’s memory wouldn't return and that she wished she lost hers too. It can be noted that she reveals feelings for Conan, only to put it off as a joke. While at her house, Ran states she is nostalgic when she sees Shinichi’s picture. The Detective Boys, not knowing Conan is Shinichi, criticizes Shinichi for being insensitive for not returning to visit Ran. Conan is visibly upset and angry about the situation. That same night, Ran asks Conan about Shinichi.

The following day, Ran, Eri, and Conan are waiting at the subway station to go shopping when suddenly, the culprit pushes Ran off onto the rails, only for Conan to save her life.

Conan is shown deeply investigating the people related to Jinno, which leads him to finally realize who the culprit is. A major breakthrough, however, is that Jinno cut the doctor who was operating on a patient who suffered from a heart attack. This apparently caused the patient's death.

Ran, at the hospital, sees Tropical Land on television, prompting the others to take her there hoping it helps with her memory. Takagi later goes to the bathroom, and a mascot character of Tropical Land approaches Rachel. The Detective Boys chases the mascot and takes them down. Kogoro removes the mascot head revealing Makoto Tomonari, son of the late Inspector Tomonari. He also finds the knife in his chest pocket. Makoto claims innocence, but arrests him. The kids celebrate their victory, but Ai doubts that this is the end. Toshiya, one of the suspects in the case, is watching quietly with a smirk on his face. Kogoro tells Ran that he's going to the police station for questioning and also tells her to stay at the Tropical Land until she regains her memory.

At the police station, Makoto is questioned. He reveals that he wasn't approaching Ran but instead he wanted to talk to Richard for his help; his knife was for protection from the killer. The men are stunned at Makoto’s confessions, and realize Ran is in grave danger.

Back at Tropical Land, the real killer attacks Ran, but Dr. Agasa protects her and is shot himself. Conan rushes to her aid and quickly takes her deep into Tropical Land, boarding a speedboat with the culprit tailing right behind them in his own. When the culprit corners them at a volcano, Conan lays down his theories. The killer is the surgeon whose hand was cut by Jinno, psychiatrist Kyosuke Kazato. He murdered Jinno as revenge for having injured his hands, ruining his promising career. After Kazato resigned, he became a psychiatrist, was consulted by one of the officers under the late Tomonari, and found out that Jinno's case 
was reopened. Kazato would go on and murder all the connections to the case. Ran became a target because she saw his face when he attacked Sato.

Conan and Ran escape via a tunnel from Kazato temporarily. Kazato catches up with them, and Conan concludes his presentation, explaining how Kazato shot Sato through an umbrella prepared with a hole in it, thus leaving no gun residue on his clothes when he stuck his arm through the hole and fired his weapon. As evidence, the victims were referring to the heart, which is a pun on Kazato past profession as a heart surgeon. Kazato approaches with a gun, and Ran asks Conan why is he protecting her, to which Conan replies that he loves her. They evade Kazato again, and Conan takes Ran to the fountain, the same place where Shinichi took Ran a long time ago. Kazato finds them and starts shooting at Conan. As the fountain turns on, Ran breaks free of her amnesia, able to remember Sato protecting her previously. She has flashbacks of multiple scenes, including one where she witnesses Kazato’s  face. The fountain turns off, giving Conan the chance to kick a Coco-Cola can at Kazato, knocking him out. He wakes up while Conan does not notice, and right when he is about to stab Conan, Ran breaks the blade with her kick, shocking Kazato. She then recalls all the events and proceeds to brutally knock out Kazato, finally defeating him. Everyone then appears and Kazato is taken into custody. News later comes that Sato survived the surgery, and will be making a full recovery.

Ran tells Conan the line her dad told her mom was that he loved her more than anything else in the world, leaving Conan saying that he can't believe he used the same pick-up line as that stupid old man, referring to Kogoro.

Cast

Music
The film's theme song is "Anata ga Iru kara" by Miho Komatsu (arranged by Daisuke Ikeda).

Home media

VHS
The VHS of the film was released on April 21, 2001. It was discontinued soon after 2006 as it was switched to DVD.

Region 2 DVD
The DVD of the film was released on January 24, 2001. A new DVD was released on February 25, 2011, significantly lowering the original price and added the trailer as a special feature.

Region 1 DVD
FUNimation Entertainment released the English dub of Case Closed - Movie: Captured in Her Eyes on Region 1 DVD on December 29, 2009.

Blu-ray
The Blu-ray version of the film was released on May 27, 2011. The Blu-ray contains the same content of the DVD plus a mini-booklet explaining the film and the BD-live function.

References

External links
 
 

Captured in Her Eyes
2000 anime films
Funimation
Films set in Tokyo
Films directed by Kenji Kodama
TMS Entertainment
Toho animated films
Works about fictional serial killers